John-Laffnie de Jager (born 17 March 1973) is a South African former tour professional tennis player.  A doubles specialist, de Jager reached the semi-finals for three different grand slam tournaments three times in three different years partnering three different fellow South African players.  de Jager is the current non-playing captain of the South Africa Davis Cup team.

Career
A native of Ermelo, de Jager turned professional in 1992 during which year he played his only tour singles.  He won two of five matches he played on the challenger circuit and reached through qualifying the main draw at Wimbledon, where he lost in the first round to future champion Richard Krajicek, 7–5 6–1 6–2.  He played but one other event in singles, a challenger in Dublin in October, before focusing his tennis exclusively on doubles.  His career high singles ranking stood at World No. 313, reached in October.

De Jager won back-to-back challenger events in doubles in September 1991, partnering compatriots, in Madeira partnering Byron Talbot and in Jerusalem with Christo van Rensburg.  He played some half dozen times with Van Rensburg in 1991-2 and some dozen times, but with limited success, with Johan de Beer.  He won two more challenger events the following year, in June partnering Zimbabwean Byron Black and in November with Capetonian Marius Barnard.  1993 saw de Jager reach his first of three grand slam semis, in partnership with yet another South African, Marcos Ondruska.  Together they reached the second round at the Roland Garros and the third round at Wimbledon.  In October, de Jager reached his first Grand Prix event final, in Lyon partnering still another South African and Capetonian, Stefan Kruger.

1994 saw de Jager reach four grand prix semi-finals, with three different partners (all southern Africans), another final and capture his first grand prix win, in Tel Aviv partnering still another compatriot, Pietermaritzburg native Lan Bale.  Aside from a few occasions, most notable of which was a four tournament stint where he partnered Aussie doubles master John Fitzgerald, de Jager and Bale remained a team into 1995.  Together they reached the Stuttgart Indoor, Munich, and Italian Open grand prix, but faltered at the French where they went out in the first round.  After a third round exit at Wimbledon, and first round exit at Flushing Meadows, the partnership was dissolved in September.  The change worked immediately for de Jager as he won his very next tournament, the Toulouse Grand Prix, partnering Swede Jonas Björkman.  He again had success in Lyon, reaching the final with star compatriot Wayne Ferriera.  Beginning 1996 playing mostly with Gary Muller, de Jager played the late spring and summer with some 10 different partners and without reaching a single event final.  His misfortune got worse in the first of half of 1997, where a string of first round loses saw his doubles ranking fall from No. 53 in September 1996 to No. 164 by August 1997.  A new partnership with yet another compatriot, this time Robbie Koenig saw de Jager recover his form, with a quarterfinal result at the U.S. Open followed by winning a challenger event and reaching the finals of another.  Then with Pretoria's Chris Haggard, he won the following two challengers as well.

De Jager began 1998 partnering Koenig, reaching the semis of the Sydney Outdoor, the third round of the Australian Open, and the second round or better of every tournament but one through Roland Garros, where they reached the third round.  Their success continued throughout the summer, culminating in but only de Jager's second grand slam semis appearance, at the 1998 U.S. Open.  During the autumn de Jager partnership altered between the one of him and Koenig and a newer one, with yet another South African, David Adams.  De Jager played exclusively with Adams for 1999 and the tandem met with success in reaching the finals or better six times in International Series events.  This led to their competing in the ATP Doubles Championship, where they lost in the round robin however.  The duo had an even year 2000 nevertheless winning back-to-back in February, in Rotterdam and London, in Munich in May, and reaching the semi-finals of Wimbledon.  At the Sydney Olympics, they again finished as semi-finalists, for de Jager, for the third and final time.  He achieved his career high ranking in doubles at the end of July, at World No. 11.

He reached two Grand Slam finals in Mixed Doubles. In 1995 he reached the final of the French Open with Jill Hetherington but they lost 6–7 6–7 to Larisa Neiland and Todd Woodbridge. In 1997 he partnered Larisa Neiland to reach the final of the Australian Open, but they lost 3–6, 7–6, 5–7 to Manon Bollegraf and Rick Leach.

Junior Grand Slam finals

Doubles: 3 (1 title, 2 runner-ups)

Major finals

Grand Slam finals

Mixed doubles: 2 (2 runners-up)

Olympic finals

Doubles: 1

ATP career finals

Doubles: 19 (7 titles, 12 runner-ups)

ATP Challenger and ITF Futures finals

Doubles: 9 (7–2)

Performance timelines

Doubles

Mixed doubles

External links
 
 
 

1973 births
Living people
Tennis players from Johannesburg
South African male tennis players
White South African people
US Open (tennis) junior champions
Tennis players at the 2000 Summer Olympics
Grand Slam (tennis) champions in boys' doubles
Olympic tennis players of South Africa
African Games medalists in tennis
African Games gold medalists for South Africa
Competitors at the 1995 All-Africa Games